Libertad María de los Ángeles Vichich Blanco (24 February 193829 April 2021) was an Argentine film actress, famous for starring in several erotic films during the 1960s.

Leblanc was one of Argentina's platinum blonde sex symbols in the 1960s and 1970s, the buxom blonde appeared in a number of adult-oriented films often with nudity or sexual content such as  Harassed (Acosada)(1964). Many of her films were controversial; the 1968 film La Endemoniada was also known in English as A Woman Possessed, a vampirish horror film with explicit nudity. In 1967 she appeared in the lustful La Venus maldita. In 1969 she appeared in Deliciosamente amoral, again lined with controversy.

Leblanc also appeared in TV versions of Nana (the novel of Émile Zola), Lola Montès and Lady Hamilton.

She was offered a contract from Columbia Pictures, but her ex-husband refused to let her leave with her daughter to another country, so she declined the offer. Also, she was considered a "rival" of Isabel Sarli, who made the same style of films. Mirtha Legrand reunited both stars in 1994, when Libertad admitted that their "rivalry" was only a LeBlanc publicity stunt, so both film stars remained friends until their death. Leblanc jokingly suggested Sarli getting rid of her pets. Isabel, for her part, showed Libertad up every time she brazenly took years off of the blonde diva's actual age. In the same manner, she told that she was a nineteen-year-old divorcée in the early sixties.

Personal life
She was married and divorced to producer Leonardo Barujel.

Genius and lead figure

Libertad's paternal grandfather was a Slovenian landowner, settled in Río Negro. She was named by her father, a handy businessman who was murdered, whose skill she inherited. Naughty in her childhood, the widow mother found a second husband and entrusted the girl's education to a Catholic school, ruled by nuns. They expelled her four times, but then her grandmother bribed them with donations, so young Libertad was finally always readmitted. Following her marital failure, she kept herself marriageable, preferring have torrid and fleeting fancy men than a stable marital union. Big-bottomed men were repulsive to her: she felt attracted by brawny males. In her adult decades, she acquired an apartment in Madrid as well as another in Catalonia. Her mental inquisitiveness was one of her distinctive traits. Agnostic, amateur gardener, having a clear conscience was paramount for her. Passionate about acting since a child, she used to take part in school plays as María de los Remedios de Escalada and Virgin Mary. In those years, she threw an inkwell against a nun's neck to the point of the latter had to be hospitalized because the former had made her bleed. Her father in law adored her and had set a lovely family up in Córdoba. He insisted that she was sweet enough to be Leonardo's wife, telling her: "you should give that crazy one up". In fact he was so glad with Libertad as daughter in law that he proposed her to replace her husband by another son of him, a brother in law, hence. Libertad was strongly resolute to become an artist against the familiar opposition and her former spouse's wishes, who expected that she would renew their married life after starving and getting penitent. However, success avoided it: with few money and still brilliant ideas she unexpectedly posed in bikini on a trampoline at a Venezuelan hotel while Graciela Borges answered journalists' questions, talking to them about Cannes, so photographers started to capture her and press workers approached to the then starlet, attracting attention that day. She also made put in every local cinema a poster stated "Libertad Leblanc, Isabel Sarli's rival". "I admired Isabel's career because when sixties started she had become a living goddess in American countries and even in Great Britain", she would confess decades later. Consequently, film directors and producers contracted Libertad, and soon her initial leading roles on screen turned out to be profitable enough to begin her independent life. And most important of all: Libertad deliberately made it without manager, she always would manage her own career. Thus, in her late twenties, the newly acclaimed actress took a stance as the self-made woman who did not want to remain subjected to anyone else. Libertad shown two lines of artificial eyelashes and two wigs off simultaneously, with the result that she appeared on screen as a transvestite, of which she was deeply proud. Get carried away by what in German it's called "Sehnsucht", "Fernweh", a very strong Eleutheromania made her went over Asia and Europe in her leisure. Her name means "freedom". Rather, the actress lived in accordance with what her name means.

Filmography
 Standard (1989) 
 Furia en la isla (1976) with Lily
 Olga, la hija de aquella princesa rusa (1972)
 Cerco de terror (1972)
 Mujeres de medianoche (1969)  
 Cautiva de la selva (1969) 
 La culpa (1969) with Márgara
 Deliciosamente amoral (1969)
 La endemoniada (1968)
 Psexoanálisis (1968)
 La casa de Madame Lulú (1968)
 El satánico (1968)
 4 contra el crimen (1968)
 Noches prohibidas (1968)
 Esclava del deseo (1968)
 El derecho de gozar (1968)
 Seis Días para Morir (La Rabia) (1967)
 Cuando los hombres hablan de mujeres (1967) 
 La Perra (1967) 
 La Venus maldita (1967) 
 La piel desnuda (1966)
 Fuego en la sangre (1965)
 La cómplice (1965)
 Una mujer sin precio (1964)
 María M. (1964)
 Acosada (1964)
 Testigo para un crimen (1963) 
 La Flor de Irupé (1962)
 La procesión (1960) 
 El bote, el río y la gente (1960) 
 El primer beso (1958)

References

External links

 

1938 births
2021 deaths
Argentine film actresses
Argentine television actresses
People from Río Negro Province
Argentine people of Slovenian descent
Argentine agnostics